Manticao, officially the Municipality of Manticao, is a 4th class municipality in the province of Misamis Oriental, Philippines. According to the 2020 census, it has a population of 29,469 people.

Manticao River was known as Naawan River until 1957, when it was renamed.

In 1948, the barrio of Manticao, then part of Initao, was constituted into the town of Manticao.

Geography
Manticao's geographical features consist of mountainous to flat plains to shorelines.

Climate

Barangays
Manticao is politically subdivided into 13 barangays.
 Argayoso
 Balintad
 Cabalantian
 Camanga
 Digkilaan
 Mahayahay
 Pagawan
 Paniangan
 Patag
 Poblacion
 Punta Silum
 Tuod
 Upper Malubog

Demographics

Economy

References

External links
 [ Philippine Standard Geographic Code]
Philippine Census Information
Local Governance Performance Management System

Municipalities of Misamis Oriental